Ato Shemsedin Ahmed or Ato Shemsedin Ahmed Robleh  also referred to as Hon. Shemsedin Ahmed,was a notable Somali Ethiopian politician.

History 
Shemsedin Ahmed hails from the Jigjiga Zone in the  Somali region, also known as region 5 in Ethiopia, specifically the Makahildhere clan of the Makahil section of the  Gadabursi clan. He was the vice-chairman of the Ethiopian Somali Democratic League and was one of the founders.

He served as Deputy-Minister of Mining and Energy since August 1991 to December 1997, Ethiopian Ambassador to Djibouti since May 2002 to May 2011 and also  Ambassador of Ethiopia to Kenya from May 2011 to December 2014.

He replaced Ato Dissasa Dirbissa in May 2011 and was replaced by Dina Mufti in December 2014 for security reasons.

References 

Year of birth missing (living people)
Living people
Government ministers of Ethiopia
Ambassadors of Ethiopia to Kenya
Gadabuursi